Wackiki Wabbit is a 1943 Warner Bros. Merrie Melodies cartoon, starring Bugs Bunny. It was released on July 3, 1943, and was written by Tedd Pierce and directed by Chuck Jones.

Mel Blanc voiced Bugs Bunny, and the two castaways were voiced by Michael Maltese and Tedd Pierce; no screen credit was given for any voice actors. Ken Harris is solely credited as the cartoon's animator, but other character animators who worked on the film were Ben Washam and Robert Cannon. John McGrew was the layout artist, and the background scenery was painted by Gene Fleury and Bernyce Polifka—all uncredited.

Plot
The cartoon opens with two castaways adrift on a small raft in the middle of the ocean, underscored with "Asleep in the Deep". Delirious from hunger, they start imagining each other, and even their own limbs, as food. They spot an island in the distance and rush ashore where they meet Bugs Bunny. To his friendly, "What's the good word, strangers?" they answer, "FOOD!" Subsequently, they set up a cooking pot and start chasing after Bugs, as he swings away on a vine.

Chasing Bugs through the jungle, the castaways spy him, semi-disguised as an island native, dancing. He welcomes them, "Ah! White Men! Welcome to Humuhumunukunukuapua'a'a'a Island." He then speaks in Polynesian-accented nonsense, a long stretch of which is subtitled simply, "What's up, Doc?" and a very short segment is subtitled, "Now is the time for every good man to come to the aid of his party."

Bugs then begins a traditional-style dance, punctuated with drumming and chanting. The men join in until the tall, skinny man, seeing Bugs stop and walk away, gives his pal a slap (off-camera, following the Hays Office rules) to make him quit. A page in an information booklet is shown to be headed: Native Customs, and goes on to explain that 'The natives are skilled at diving for coins dropped into the water'. The men drop a coin into the cooking pot's boiling water; Bugs dashes in and steals the entire pot.

While Bugs takes a bath in the hot water, the men set up a dining table; the short, fat one bastes the rabbit. They begin singing, "We're gonna have roast rabbit". Bugs sings too, until he realizes he is the roast rabbit and climbs speedily up into a treehouse. He then tricks the castaways by lowering a skinned chicken into the cooking pot. He taunts them with the chicken, using it as a marionette and giving it a voice, in order to make the two think it is somehow alive. The strings eventually tangle and, as Bugs struggles with it, the chicken is actually manipulated to point up, tipping off the men. They yank Bugs from the treehouse; there is an intense, brief struggle and, in the end Bugs escapes with the meat of the chicken.

As the castaways wail in frustration, they hear a steam whistle from a ship. Once the men leap for joy at the prospect of being saved and trot toward the gangplank, Bugs kisses them goodbye and presents them with leis, then pulls his time-honored switcheroo trick and boards the ship himself. The boat pulls out, leaving the two men on the island, waving goodbye to Bugs. Realizing they have been tricked, the Skinny Man slaps the Fat Man (again, off-camera) for continuing to shout, "Goodbye!" The two at once imagine each other as a hot dog and a hamburger and chase each other into the distance.

Airings
On TV airings, the part where Bugs speaks to the Hawaiian castaways contains a blue border appearing on both United States and Europe Turner 1995 prints such as Cartoon Network.

Home media
Wackiki Wabbit is currently in the public domain after United Artists (which absorbed Associated Artists Productions) failed to renew the copyright. The cartoon can be found restored, on Looney Tunes Golden Collection: Volume 3.

References

External links

 
 https://www.wackikiwabbit.com/
Watch Wackiki Wabbit in fully restored HD at Laugh Bureau Vintage

1943 films
1943 short films
1943 animated films
1940s animated short films
Merrie Melodies short films
Warner Bros. Cartoons animated short films
Short films directed by Chuck Jones
Films about castaways
Films set in Oceania
Films set on islands
Films scored by Carl Stalling
Films produced by Leon Schlesinger
Bugs Bunny films
1940s Warner Bros. animated short films